Karlene Ann Maywald (born 26 May 1961) is an Australian National Party politician who represented the seat of Chaffey in the South Australian House of Assembly from October 1997 until March 2010. 
Her election to the South Australian Parliament made her leader of the South Australian Nationals and made her the first woman to lead a branch of the party at the state or federal level.
During her tenure, from 2004 until 2010, she was the Minister for the River Murray and Minister for Water Security in the Rann Labor government. She is currently the Chair of the National Water Commission and a Director of SA Water, as well as Managing Director of Maywald Consultants Pty Ltd.

Political career
A small businessperson before entering Parliament, Maywald was first elected to parliament at the 1997 state election on a margin of 2.6 percent. In contrast to federal politics and in some other states, the Nationals do not have a coalition agreement with the Liberal Party in South Australia. She thus sat as a crossbencher during the term of the Liberal Government, voting against the privatisation of ETSA. In 1998, during her first term in Parliament, Maywald became the first member of parliament to give birth to a child while in office when her daughter Tilly Rose was born.

Winning an increased majority at the 2002 state election on a 14 percent two-candidate preferred margin, Maywald voted for a Kerin Liberal government over a Rann Labor Government and later voted against the state government's industrial relations package. In 2004, however, Maywald was convinced to become a minister in the Labor government, but signed a comprehensive agreement with Labor reserving her right to vote against any government initiative which affected her electorate or the business community. This informal ALP-NAT alliance or "agreement" as distinct from a formal coalition, caused uproar. In October 2013 Karlene Maywald during a conversation about this period with political scientist, Dr Haydon Manning from Flinders University, stressed that it is erroneous, as some have argued, to refer her acceptance of a ministry with the Rann Government as representing a 'coalition' with Labor. The South Australian Branch of the National Party temporarily split from the federal organization after branch President John Venus offered to 'voluntarily withdraw' until at least after the federal election. Venus stressed that the state branch was not in 'coalition' with Labor. Maywald conceded the Labor Party had 'most definitely been very clever' in shoring up its parliamentary support, but said 'it works both ways'.
'They wouldn't offer me a position if they didn't think I was capable of doing it,’ she said. 'The issue is not about the money, the issue is the River Murray - I wouldn't have taken any other portfolio.'
She was still 'very supportive of (federal leader) John Anderson' and hoped the Howard Coalition would win the federal election.
Upset by the move Federal Liberal MP for Sturt Christopher Pyne labelling Ms Maywald's 'a disgrace' and that he considered her  'extremely naive if she thinks that Mike Rann hasn't played her like a violin in order to shut the Liberal Party out.'

Professor Andrew Parkin, writing the South Australian Political Chronicle for the Australian Journal of Politics and History observed that

'Maywald attributed her acceptance of the offer of a ministerial place to the lure of the new River Murray portfolio: "I thought long and hard about it and what was in the best interests of my electorate, my family, the state and the River Murray" (Advertiser, 23 July 2004). She had not compromised her "conservative" ideals, she claimed, because "quite frankly, the Rann Labor Government have demonstrated that they are probably more conservative than the last Liberal government" (Advertiser, 24 July 2004). 
With a Federal election on the horizon, the South Australian branch of the National Party—which endorsed the move to coalesce with Labor—had to disaffiliate from its national organisation which was committed, of course, to a coalition with the Liberals. Still Maywald claimed to be "very supportive of John Anderson", her party's national leader, and she hoped the Howard Coalition Government, rather than her new Labor allies, would be returned to office in the Federal election (Advertiser, 24 July 2004). In due course, the Howard Government was indeed returned—and in December the South Australian branch quietly reattached itself to the rest of the National Party.' [Australian Journal of Politics and History, Political Chronicles, South Australia: 51 (2) June 2005]

The Maywald ministry marks the first time the Labor and National parties have formed a political alliance since the Albert Dunstan Victorian state government of 1935–43. The agreement with Labor included a commitment to retain her as a minister if Labor won the 2006 election  so Maywald remained in cabinet even after Labor won an outright majority in 2006. At that election she increased her vote to a 17 percent two-candidate margin.

An Advertiser poll in August 2008 revealed a decrease in the National vote in Chaffey. The poll of 460 voters conducted in her electorate found the National primary vote has fallen to just 11 percent, from a peak of 53.3 percent (67.2 after preferences) at the 2006 election. Some critics of the poll argued that without stating the candidate, and only naming the party, the poll deprived Maywald of name recognition. A February 2010 poll which included candidates names found 27 percent support for the Nationals, with a two-candidate margin against the Liberals of 50.5 to 49.5 percent.

Maywald lost her seat of Chaffey to Liberal candidate Tim Whetstone in the 2010 election after a two-candidate preferred swing of 20 percent.

References

External links
National Party biography

Poll Bludger electorate profile

 

National Party of Australia members of the Parliament of South Australia
Members of the South Australian House of Assembly
1961 births
Living people
Women members of the South Australian House of Assembly
Fellows of the Australian Academy of Technological Sciences and Engineering
21st-century Australian politicians
21st-century Australian women politicians